

Events
January 5 – In Paris, Antonio Salieri signs a contract with the Opéra for a work entitled Les Danaïdes.
January 7 – Composer Pierre-Alexandre Monsigny marries Amélie de Villemagne.
February 9 – The Piano Concerto No. 14 becomes the first entry in the catalogue of works by Wolfgang Amadeus Mozart.
March – 28-year-old Mozart gives the first performances of his Piano Concerto No. 15 at the Trattnerhof and Burgtheater in Vienna.
April 24 – Mozart writes to his father Leopold, recommending the work of newcomer Ignaz Pleyel.
April 29 – Wolfgang Amadeus Mozart and violinist Regina Strinasacchi perform Mozart's Sonata in B-flat for Violin and Keyboard (K.454) for the first time, in the presence of Joseph II, Holy Roman Emperor.
May 27 – June 5 – Handel Commemoration concerts in Westminster Abbey, London.
June 13 – Wolfgang Amadeus Mozart's Piano Concerto No. 17 is performed for the first time, by his student, Barbara von Ployer.  Giovanni Paisiello is in the audience.
August 17 – Luigi Boccherini is given a pay rise of 12000 reals by his employer, the Infante Luis, Count of Chinchón.
August 28 – In Vienna, Johann Georg Albrechtsberger's Mass in E flat is performed for the first time, with the orchestral arrangement replaced by organ accompaniment, in accordance with the preferences of Joseph II, Holy Roman Emperor.
December 11 – Mozart is received into the Masonic lodge "Beneficence".
The first opera is mounted at the unfinished Teatro Nuovo in Bergamo, Lombardy, Giuseppe Sarti's Medonte, re di Epiro.

Classical music
Jean-Jacques Beauvarlet-Charpentier – Journal d'orgue 1–9

Niel Gow – A Collection of Strathspey Reels, etc.
Joseph Haydn 
6 Divertimentos, Hob.IV:6–11
Keyboard Sonata in G major, Hob.XVI:40 (no. 54)
Keyboard Sonata in B-flat major, Hob.XVI:41 (no. 55)
Keyboard Sonata in D major, Hob.XVI:42 (no. 56)
24 Lieder, Hob.XXVIa:13–24 (second book)
Michael Haydn – Symphony in B-flat major; Symphony in C major
Sabine Hitzelberger – Für fülende Seelen am Klavier
Edward Jones – Musical and Poetical Relicks of the Welsh Bards, including "Deck the Halls"
Leopold Kozeluch – Keyboard Concerto in F major, P.IV:1
Wolfgang Amadeus Mozart
Piano Concerto No. 14
Piano Concerto No. 15
Giovanni Paisiello – Six quartets, Op. 1
Joseph Reicha – Cello Concerto in D major
Giovanni Battista Viotti – Duetto concertante for 2 Violins in D major; Duetto concertante for 2 Violins in D minor

Opera
Pasquale Anfossi – Issipile, May 8, King's Theatre, London.
Luigi Cherubini – L'Idalide
Domenico Cimarosa 
L'apparenza inganna
Artaserse
I due supposti conti
I matrimoni impensati
L'Olimpiade, July 10, Teatro Eretenio, Vicenza.
La vanità delusa
André Grétry 
L'épreuve villageoise
Richard Coeur de Lion
Joseph Haydn – Armida
Thomas Linley – The Spanish Rivals
Antonio Salieri
Les Danaïdes
Il ricco d'un giorno (libretto by Lorenzo Da Ponte)
Andrea Luchesi – Ademira
Giovanni Paisiello – Il Re Teodoro
Niccolò Piccinni – Diane et Endymion
Antonio Sacchini – Dardanus

Births
January 1 – William Beale, composer and organist (died 1854)
January 27 – Martin-Joseph Mengal, composer (died 1851)
January 29 – Ferdinand Ries, composer
February 3 – John Fane, composer and diplomat
February 27 – Job Plimpton, composer (died 1864)
March 25 – François-Joseph Fétis, Belgian musicologist, composer, critic and teacher (died 1871)
April 8 – Dionisio Aguado, guitarist and composer (died 1849)
June 14 – Francesco Morlacchi, opera composer (died 1841)
July 27 – George Onslow, composer (died 1853)
August 5 – Louis Spohr, composer, violinist and conductor (died 1859)
August 23
Jeanette Wässelius, operatic soprano  (died 1853) 
Henriette Löfman, composer  (died 1836)
October 15 – Thomas Hastings, composer (died 1872)
November 7 – Friedrich Wilhelm Kalkbrenner, German pianist and composer
date unknown – Samuel Simms, organist and composer (died 1868)
November 28 – Ferdinand Ries, composer and friend of Beethoven (died 1838)

Deaths
March 4 – Ann Cargill, opera singer (born 1760) (drowned)
July 1 – Wilhelm Friedemann Bach, composer (born 1710)
August – Louis Anseaume, opera librettist
August 6 – Karl Kohaut, lutenist and composer (born 1726)
August 4 – Giovanni Battista Martini, composer (born 1706)
September
John Bennett, organist and composer (born c.1735)
Maria Linley, singer (born 1763)
September 12 – Manuel Blasco de Nebra, organist and composer (born 1750)
October 5 (or 1785) – Antonín Kammel, violinist and composer (born 1730)
November 6 – Anine Frölich, ballet dancer (born 1762)
date unknown
John Pixell, poet and composer (born 1725)
Yekaterina Sinyavina, pianist and composer (date of birth unknown)

References

 
18th century in music
Music by year